Wu Tsung-yi (born 25 October 1972) is a Taiwanese archer. He competed in the men's individual and team events at the 1996 Summer Olympics.

References

1972 births
Living people
Taiwanese male archers
Olympic archers of Taiwan
Archers at the 1996 Summer Olympics
Place of birth missing (living people)
Archers at the 1994 Asian Games
Archers at the 1998 Asian Games
Asian Games medalists in archery
Asian Games silver medalists for Chinese Taipei
Asian Games bronze medalists for Chinese Taipei
Medalists at the 1994 Asian Games
Medalists at the 1998 Asian Games
20th-century Taiwanese people